The Association for Information Systems (AIS) is an international, not-for-profit, professional association for scholars of information systems that was established in 1994. The association publishes journals, organizes conferences, and provides a forum for information systems professors and managers. It has members in more than 100 countries.

The association is led by a president who is annually elected from one of three world regions—the Americas, Europe and Africa and Asia-Pacific—on a rotating basis. The governing council is made up of elected functional vice-presidents and other officers and council members who are elected in the three world regions.

The association organizes four annual conferences for IS researchers, educators and students: The International Conference on Information Systems (ICIS), which alternates between the three world regions, and three regional conferences: the Americas Conference on Information Systems (AMCIS), the European Conference on Information Systems (ECIS), and the Pacific Asia Conference on Information Systems (PACIS).

Publications 
The association publishes academic journals including:
 Journal of the Association for Information Systems (JAIS)
 Scandinavian Journal of Information Systems (SJIS)
 Revista Latinoamericana Y Del Caribe De La Associacion De Sistemas De Informacion (RELCASI)
 Pacific Asia Journal of the Association for Information Systems (PAJAIS)
 Journal of the Midwest Association for Information Systems (JMWAIS)
 Journal of Information Technology Theory and Application (JITTA)
 Communications of the Association for Information Systems (CAIS)
 AIS Transactions on Replication Research (TRR)
 AIS Transactions on Human-Computer Interaction (THCI)
Affiliated journals include:
 Business & Information Systems Engineering (BISE)
 Management Information Systems Quarterly (MISQ)
 MIS Quarterly Executive (MISQe)
 Information Systems Journal (ISJ)
 Systèmes d'Information et Management (SIM)
 Foundations and Trends in Information Systems (FnTIS)
Both AIS published titles and affiliated journals are included in the AIS eLibrary, which is accessible as a benefit of membership.

Leo Award 
Since 1999 the AIS annually grants the Leo Award to one or more persons, who have made exceptional contributions to the research and practice of Information Systems. Award recipients have been:

 1999 : C. West Churchman, J. Daniel Couger, Börje Langefors, Enid Mumford
 2000 : Gordon B. Davis
 2001 : Richard O. Mason
 2002 : Jay Nunamaker, Paul Gray
 2003 : Frank Land, John F. Rockart
 2004 : William Richard King, Rob Kling
 2005 : Andrew B. Whinston
 2006 : Niels Bjørn-Andersen, Phillip Ein-Dor
 2007 : Izak Benbasat, Ephraim McLean
 2008 : Dewald Roode, M. Lynne Markus, Robert W. Zmud, Kenneth L. Kraemer
 2009 : Daniel Robey, E. Burton Swanson
 2010 : Blake Ives, Carol Saunders
 2011 : Richard (Rick) Watson, Ron Weber
 2012 : Bob Galliers, Detmar Straub
 2013 : Rudy Hirschheim, Kalle Lyytinen
 2014 : Joey George, Ting-Ping (T.P.) Liang
 2015 : Dennis Galletta, Allen Lee, Kwok Kee Wei, Dov Te'eni
 2016 : Richard Baskerville, James Marsden
 2017 : Sirkka Jarvenpaa, Vallabh Sambamurthy
 2018 : David Avison, Jane Fedorowicz
 2019 : Ritu Agarwal, Michael D. Myers, Arun Rai
 2020 : Cynthia Beath, Varun Grover, Elena Karahanna, Jae Kyu Lee

Other Awards 
The AIS awards several other awards including for best papers of the field and for educational achievement.

References 

Organizations with year of establishment missing
Computer science-related professional associations
International non-profit organizations
Information technology organizations
Organizations based in Illinois
Information systems